Ad astra is a Latin phrase meaning "to the stars". The phrase has origins with Virgil, who wrote in his Aeneid: "sic itur ad astra" ('thus one journeys to the stars') and "opta ardua pennis astra sequi" ('desire to pursue the high[/hard to reach] stars on wings'). Another origin is Seneca the Younger, who wrote in Hercules: "non est ad astra mollis e terris via" ('there is no easy way from the earth to the stars').

Etymology 
Ad is a Latin preposition expressing direction toward in space or time (e.g. ad nauseam, ad infinitum, ad hoc, ad libidem, ad valorem, ad hominem). It is also used as a prefix in Latin word formation.

Astra is the accusative plural form of the Latin word astrum 'star' (from Ancient Greek ἄστρον astron 'star', from Proto-Indo-European *h₂ster-).

Mottos 
Ad astra is used as, or as part of, the motto of many organizations, most prominently, air forces. It has also been adopted as a proper name for various unrelated things (publications, bands, video games, etc.). It likewise sees general use as a popular Latin tag.

Ad astra
 Ad Astra Rocket Company, Webster, Texas, United States
 Motto of Astor family
 Innova Junior College, Singapore
 Presbyterian Ladies' College, Armidale, Australia
 United States Air Force Academy Class of 2007
 United States Coast Guard Academy Class of 1992
 USS Taurus (PHM-3)
 University College Dublin, member institution of the National University of Ireland
 Downe House School, AGN house motto

Ad astra per alas porci
"To the stars on the wings of a pig"
 Motto on John Steinbeck's personal stamp, featuring a figure of the Pigasus.  Steinbeck's motto had an error in the Latin and used 'alia' instead of 'alas'.
 Title of Chris Thile's Mandolin Concerto.

Ad astra per aspera

"To the stars through difficulties;" "a rough road leads to the stars;" or "Through hardships, to the stars."
 Aeronautica Militare Italiana (eng.: The Italian Air Force), is the air force of the Italian Republic. The Italian Air Force was founded as an independent service arm on 28 March 1923 by King Victor Emmanuel III as the Regia Aeronautica ("Royal Air Force"). Italy was among the earliest adopters of military aviation. Its air arm dates back to 1884, when the Italian Royal Army (Regio Esercito) was authorised to acquire its own air component.
 Albury High School in Albury, New South Wales, Australia
 Apollo 1 memorial placed at Launch Complex 34
 Campbell University in Buies Creek, North Carolina
 Immaculate Conception High School in Saint Andrew Parish, Jamaica, West Indies
 Kansas (U.S. state motto)
 Morristown-Beard School in Morristown, New Jersey
 Mount Saint Michael Academy in The Bronx, New York City
 Starfleet, the fictional organization in the Star Trek universe
 Woodville High School, South Australia

De profundis ad astra
"From the depths to the stars."
 Los Angeles Science Fantasy Society. The official motto of the world's oldest continually operating science fiction fan social club, founded in 1934.

Per ardua ad astra

"Through adversity to the stars" or "Through struggle to the stars."
 Royal Air Force
 Royal Australian Air Force
 Royal Canadian Air Force (prior to 1968)
 Royal Flying Corps
 Royal New Zealand Air Force
 Air Operations Branch of the Canadian Armed Forces
 University of Birmingham

Per aspera ad astra
"Through hardships to the stars" or "To the stars through difficulties."
 Coat of arms of Mecklenburg-Schwerin
 South African Air Force
 Stevens Institute of Technology
 Duchy of Mecklenburg-Schwerin
 State of Kansas (Ad astra per aspera)
 Municipality of Cheribon, Netherlands East Indies
 City of Gouda, The Netherlands
 Instituto Nacional Mejía

Per audacia ad astra
"Through boldness to the stars."
 Bungie

Quam celerrime ad astra
"speedily to the stars."
Chilean Air Force

Sic itur ad astra
"Thus one goes to the stars."
 The Philomathean Society, Philadelphia, PA, USA
 The Canongate, Edinburgh
Admiral Collingwood Lodge, Australia
 Richmond, Virginia (city)
 Argentine Air Force, Materiel Command, Argentina
 The Geelong College, Australia
 Canadian Air Force (1920–24)
 Colombian Air Force
 48 Air School in Woodbridge East London, one of the British Commonwealth Air Training Plan facilities in South Africa. Other units had Ad Unum Ad Astra and Per Artem Ad Astra.
 Llandysul Grammar School, Llandysul, Ceredigion, Wales

"Such is the pathway to the stars."
 Canadian Forces Air Command
 Royal Canadian Air Force
 Brazilian Air Force Academy, in Pirassununga - São Paulo, Brazil. The Brazilian Air Force Academy uses the variation "Macte animo! Generose puer, ic itur ad astra!" which means: "Be brave! Young ones, this is the pathway to the stars."

"Reach for the stars."
 The Hertfordshire and Essex High School, Bishop's Stortford, Hertfordshire, England
 Falcon College, Zimbabwe

": Macte animo generose puer! Sic itur ad astra

Other uses
 A related phrase, ex astris ('from the stars'), is used frequently in NASA publications and in science fiction—see Ex astris, scientia.
 Ad Astra is a 1976 public artwork by American artist Richard Lippold. Lippold's sculpture is located outside the Jefferson Drive entrance, and in the collection, of the National Air and Space Museum.
 A 1984 computer game, Ad Astra is an outer space shoot-em-up with a 3-D perspective.
 "Ad Astra" is the title of a William Faulkner short story, found in Collected Stories of William Faulkner (New York: Vintage International).
 Ad Astra is the title of a 2019 science fiction film starring Brad Pitt.
 The phrase Sic itur ad astra was also used in the Netflix television series Trese.
 The phrase Ad astra abyssosque was used as the motto for the Adventurer's Guild in the game Genshin Impact.

References

External links
 History of the RAF motto (but note that this page misspells sic itur)

Latin mottos
Latin words and phrases